Owl's clover may refer to plants in several closely related genera:

Castilleja
Orthocarpus 
Triphysaria